Batman Returns: Original Motion Picture Soundtrack is the score album for the 1992 film Batman Returns by Danny Elfman. The soundtrack also includes "Face to Face", a song written by the band Siouxsie and the Banshees and Elfman, that was used to promote the movie. Two versions of the music video were made (the other added shots from the movie), and a club version, remixed by 808 State, was released. Elfman added chorus to the main theme making it similar but not as dark as the original.

Track listing

The usage of multiple instances of "Part I" and "Part II" prompted confusion from consumers, and was heavily criticized by soundtrack critic site Filmtracks, who proposed a different tracklist.

Complete score
La-La Land Records released Danny Elfman's complete score to Batman Returns on November 30, 2010.

Disc one

Disc two

(*) Previously unreleased
(**) Contains previously unreleased material

Chart positions

References

1992 soundtrack albums
1990s film soundtrack albums
Batman (1989 film series)
Batman film soundtracks
Danny Elfman soundtracks
Film scores
Warner Records soundtracks